Jack Rymill (20 March 1901 – 11 February 1976) was an Australian cricketer. He played in twenty-two first-class matches for South Australia between 1921 and 1927.

See also
 List of South Australian representative cricketers

References

External links
 

1901 births
1976 deaths
Australian cricketers
South Australia cricketers
Cricketers from Adelaide